Solanum trilobatum is an herb that can be consumed by mildly frying it in oil or ghee and then grinding it.

The plant is full of thorns, including the leaves. It is important to remove these thorns before cooking as the thorns are considered to be mildly toxic. The herb can be stored in powdered form by drying the leaves under shade and making a powder out of it. Its native range is India, Sri Lanka and Indochina.

References

trilobatum
Plants described in 1753
Taxa named by Carl Linnaeus